Agresti is a surname of Italian origin. People with this surname include:

 Alan Agresti (born 1947), American statistician
 Alejandro Agresti (born 1961), Argentine film director
 Livio Agresti (1508–1580), Italian painter
 Olivia Rossetti Agresti (1875–1960), English activist, author, editor, and interpreter
 Sabrina Agresti-Roubache (born 1976), French politician

References 

Italian-language surnames